Antonio Jonjić (born 2 August 1999) is a German professional footballer who plays as a midfielder for  club Erzgebirge Aue.

Career
Jonjić made his professional debut for 1. FC Kaiserslautern in the 3. Liga on 26 January 2019, coming on as a substitute in the 83rd minute for Christoph Hemlein in the 2–0 home win against Sonnenhof Großaspach.

Jonjić moved to FC Erzgebirge Aue on 5 October 2020, the last day of the 2020 summer transfer window. He signed a three-year contract.

References

External links
 
 
 

Living people
1999 births
German people of Croatian descent
Sportspeople from Ludwigshafen
German footballers
Footballers from Rhineland-Palatinate
Association football midfielders
2. Bundesliga players
3. Liga players
1. FC Kaiserslautern II players
1. FC Kaiserslautern players
FC Erzgebirge Aue players